West Virginia Route 57 is an east–west state highway in northern West Virginia. The eastern terminus is at U.S. Route 119 southwest of Philippi.

The road acts as an ideal connector road between Philippi and Clarksburg as the road has few sharp curves and, as a state route, is better maintained than other area roads. The speed limit for the road's entire  duration is 55 miles per hour.

Major intersections

References

057
Transportation in Barbour County, West Virginia
Transportation in Harrison County, West Virginia